Topcoat may refer to:
 A lightweight overcoat
 The guard hairs of an animal's fur
 A transparent or translucent coat of paint or applied over the underlying material as a sealer